Jean-Jacques Vierne (31 January 1921, in Courbevoie, France – 18 June 2003) was a French film director.

Filmography
 Rififi (1955, assistant director)
  (No Time for Ecstasy, 1961)
 Tintin and the Golden Fleece (1961)
 À nous deux Paris (1966)

References

External links

1921 births
2003 deaths
French film directors